The Embracing Skeletons of Alepotrypa are a pair of human skeletons dated as approximately 5,800 years old. They were discovered by archaeologists in the Alepotrypa cave in Laconia, Greece. The pair were dated to 3,800 BCE and DNA analysis confirmed that the remains belong to a man and woman who died when they were 20 to 25 years of age. 

The prehistoric skeletons died in a lover’s embrace with the man lying behind the woman, draping his arms over her, and with their legs intertwined.
They're totally spooning, The boy is the big spoon, and the girl is the little spoon: Their arms are draped over each other, their legs are intertwined. It's unmistakable.
—Bill Parkinson, associate curator of Eurasian anthropology at Chicago's Field Museum
Greek archaeologist Anastasia Papathanasiou said about the couple's pose; "It's a very natural hug; it doesn't look like they were arranged in this posture at a much later date." The cause of death of the two individuals is currently unknown.

See also 
List of unsolved deaths
Lovers of Cluj-Napoca
Lovers of Modena
Lovers of Teruel
Lovers of Valdaro
The Hunchback of Notre-Dame

References 

Archaeological sites in the Peloponnese (region)
Archaeology of death
Burial monuments and structures
Couples
Human remains (archaeological)
Neolithic sites in Greece
Laconia
Skeletons
Unsolved deaths